151st Division or 151st Infantry Division may refer to:

 151st Division (Imperial Japanese Army)
 Italian 151st Garrison Division
Fictious unit featured in the 1954 film White Christmas